The 2020 Football Championship of Kyiv Oblast was won by Kudrivka Irpin.

League table

References

Football
Kiev Ob
Kiev Ob